Visaranai is a 2015 Indian Tamil-language crime drama film written and directed by Vetrimaaran. It is based on the novel Lock Up by M. Chandrakumar. The film stars Dinesh, Anandhi, Samuthirakani, Aadukalam Murugadoss, Kishore, Pradheesh Raj, and Silambarasan Rathnasamy. The film deals with lives of two men before and after thrown into a kafkaesque scenario in which they get tortured for confession.

The film premiered in the Orrizonti (Horizons) section of the 72nd Venice Film Festival, where it won the Amnesty International Italia Award. The film was released in India on 5 February 2016 and received highly positive reviews from both critics and audience alike. Many issues arose regarding the film in Tamil Nadu among the police force. At the 63rd National Film Awards, the film won three honours: Best Feature Film in Tamil, Best Supporting Actor for Samuthirakani and Best Editing for Kishore Te. It was selected as India's official entry for the Best Foreign Language Film at the 89th Academy Awards but it was not nominated. At the 64th Filmfare Awards South, the film was nominated for the Best Film, Best Director for Vetrimaaran and won the award for the Best Supporting Actor for Samuthirakani.

Plot 
Pandi, Murugan, Afzal, and Kumar are Tamil labourers who are working in Guntur, Andhra Pradesh and living in a nearby park and working to make ends meet. A Tamil man named Muthuvel is shown to be undertaking some operation in Andhra Pradesh along with a group of men. The lives of the four labourers take a turn for worse when they are caught, beaten and tortured brutally in police lock-up for a theft that they did not commit, due to police's need to close a high-profile robbery case. The four resist the torture and refuse to confess but are forced to relent due to the police brutality. However, when produced in court, they speak out the true set of events to the judge. Muthuvel, who is shown to be a police inspector, helps them go free by translating for them in court and vouching for them. Before the men can leave, Muthuvel enlists their help to kidnap a high-profile auditor named K.K who has surrendered in the same court. It is shown that Muthuvel's police team had come there unofficially to nab KK before he surrendered. Since Muthuvel's team are closely watched by KK's lawyers inside the court, Muthuvel gives the 4 boys a task to bring KK out of the court. Muthuvel's seniors use their influence to make the court police aid them and KK is kidnapped by the 4 boys. The men are brought back to Tamil Nadu, and Kumar is dropped on the way to Chennai. The remaining three men are asked by Muthuvel to clean the police station before leaving. The nature of Muthuvel's case is then revealed.

The kidnapping was masterminded by the Deputy Commissioner (DCP), under directions from the top brass of the ruling political party of the state, to use K.K in court and take down the President of the opposition party, since general elections are merely 5 months away. Meanwhile, the Assistant Commissioner (ACP), who is on the payroll of the opposition party, convinces the DCP to play a double game and get three crores (30 million) rupees from the opposition for dropping the case. However, buying the DCP's bluff, the opposition party fears that K.K has given up their secrets and orders the ACP to interrogate him, during which he dies from the injuries sustained. Since the death happened in Muthuvel's station when Muthuvel was on charge, he and his men take KK's body to KK's beach house and set up his death as suicide by hanging. Later, A discussion ensues to figure out a way to get the bribe and to cover up the death as a suicide.

After the meeting, the DCP sees Pandi and Afzal cleaning in an adjoining bathroom and suspects that they might have overheard the plan. To cover up, they decide to frame Pandi and his friends as convicts in a pending ATM robbery case, and eliminate them under the cover of an encounter. Muthuvel, who feels responsible for the three men, is fed up with the corruption and immorality of the events that have transpired and initially refuses to cooperate, but he is coerced because of his deep involvement. During the staged encounter, Afzal is killed, causing Pandi and Murugan to run away. In the ensuing pursuit, Murugan is shot and killed. Muthuvel chases Pandi and negotiates with him, assuring no harm and promising a spot in front of the media to expose the corruption. Meanwhile, orders arrive from the DCP to tie up loose ends and eliminate Muthuvel as well. As the film cuts to black, gunshots are heard, followed by a conversation that reveals the deaths of both Muthuvel and Pandi. A plan is made for the press coverage of Muthuvel's death 'in the line of duty', alongside photographs of his family to hold the attention and sympathy of the public.

In the epilogue it is shown that this film is based on the novel written by real-life Kumar, who has been felicitated by multiple human rights organisations.

Cast 

 Attakathi Dinesh as Pandi
 Murugadoss as Murugan
 Samuthirakani as Muthuvel
 Kishore as K. K.
 E. Ramdoss as Ramachandran
 Ajay Ghosh as Vishveshwara Rao
 Anandhi as Shanthi
 Silambarasan Rathnasamy as Afzal
 Pradheesh Raj as Kumar
 Misha Ghoshal as Sindhu
 Saravana Subbiah as Saravanan
 Halwa Vasu
 Munnar Ramesh as Ramesh
 Dhaya Senthil as Neethipathi
 Vettai Muthukumar as Rathnasamy
 Cheran Raj as Goule
 Supergood Subramani

Production 
The film was adapted from the novel titled Lock up, written by M. Chandrakumar, an auto rickshaw driver in Coimbatore. Vetrimaaran chose to begin the film before the schedule for his other venture Vada Chennai (2018) and signed up actors Attakathi Dinesh and Aadukalam Murugadoss to play convicts in the film. The film earlier had the working titles of Kutravaali and Lock-Up, during the first schedule in Guindy. The first half of the film was finished completely in September 2014 in locations across Hyderabad. The director later announced that the film would be an experimental film lasting only 60 minutes. Anandhi joined the cast as heroine in October 2014, being selected after Vetrimaran was impressed with her performance in his production venture, Poriyaalan (2014) and Prabhu Solomon's Kayal (2014). Telugu film actor Ajay Ghosh stated that he played the role of an inspector in the film and would appear throughout the first half.

Release
The satellite rights of the film were sold to STAR Vijay. The film is also available as VOD on Netflix.

Critical reception 
This film received the best movie award from Tamil magazine Ananda Vikatan in Ananda Vikatan Cinema Awards 2016. IndiaGlitz.com had rated the film 4.5 out of 5 and said, "Visaranai is by no means only an art or docu film, but fits into the commercial arena as well as it has thrills, especially a nail biting climax, humour, action, a little painful love story in the background and above all filled with real life incidents which one can easily relate to". Twitch Film viewed Visarnai as a top class film about reality comparable to 2012 Cannes favourite Gangs of Wasseypur. The Hindu wrote "Visaranai is beautifully filmed, though there isn't much room for beauty. The frames appear to have been snatched from the back alleys of life. The verité illusion is aided by the utterly lifelike performances—even if the word "performance" seems wrong.". Rediff wrote "Director Vetrimaaran deserves credit for having extracted the best from all his actors. They are so remarkable you sense their terror as they stutter and stumble with their broken and bruised bodies. The hard-hitting screenplay is relentless, making no effort to shield you from the harsh realities of the ruthless world we live in today." Behindwoods wrote "Some may call Visaranai to be a violent film, while most of the others may say it is a brilliant piece of art that is so real and suspenseful. But if you’re a fan of crime thriller or film that depicts pain, do not miss it!"

Overseas, Hollywood Reporter wrote "Vetri Maaran’s tense socio-political thriller lands a well-aimed punch at rampant police brutality and corruption, to which the only response from the viewer is towering indignation. It may not break new ground in its subject or style of narration, but it covers the old ground extremely well, and its premise is so convincing and realistic that it seems like non-fiction. The first part, at least, is non-fiction, while the film’s second half turns into a fast-paced thriller...Maaran and Kumar extend the horror to include the upper echelons in the police and government, who also need scapegoats to cover their crimes. This mirror plot becomes an ever more threatening nocturnal thriller, and takes the film much wider in terms of potential audience."

Awards and nominations

See also
 List of submissions to the 89th Academy Awards for Best Foreign Language Film
 List of Indian submissions for the Academy Award for Best Foreign Language Film

References

External links 

 Visaranai at Moviesda
 Visaranai at Isaimini
 Visaranai at Moviesda

2015 films
Films based on Indian novels
2015 crime thriller films
Indian prison films
Indian crime thriller films
Indian films based on actual events
Films about police brutality
Films set in Andhra Pradesh
Films scored by G. V. Prakash Kumar
Films based on crime novels
Films featuring a Best Supporting Actor National Film Award-winning performance
2010s Tamil-language films
Films about police misconduct
Fictional portrayals of the Tamil Nadu Police
Films shot in Hyderabad, India
Films whose editor won the Best Film Editing National Award
Best Tamil Feature Film National Film Award winners
Fictional portrayals of the Andhra Pradesh Police
Films set in Chennai
Films shot in Vijayawada
Films shot in Andhra Pradesh
Films directed by Vetrimaaran